Parotocinclus adamanteus is a species of catfish in the family Loricariidae. It is native to South America, where it occurs in the Paraguaçu River basin in the state of Bahia in Brazil. A phylogenetic analysis reportedly indicates that P. adamanteus is most closely related to three other species in the genus Parotocinclus: P. jequi, P. prata, and P. robustus. The species was first described in 2019 by Edson H. L. Pereira, Alexandre Clistenes de A. Santos, Mário C. C. de Pinna, and Roberto E. Reis. FishBase does not list this species.

References 

Loricariidae
Otothyrinae
Fish described in 2019
Fish of Brazil